The second series of Law & Order: UK premiered on ITV on 10 September 2010 and concluded on 4 April 2011.

Cast

Main

Law
 Bradley Walsh as Senior Detective Sergeant Ronnie Brooks
 Jamie Bamber as Junior Detective Sergeant Matt Devlin
 Harriet Walter as Detective Inspector Natalie Chandler

Order
 Ben Daniels as Senior Crown Prosecutor James Steel
 Freema Agyeman as Junior Crown Prosecutor Alesha Phillips
 Bill Paterson as George Castle, Director of London Crown Prosecution Service

Episodes
{| class="wikitable plainrowheaders" style="width: 100%; margin-left: 0;"
|-
! style="background-color:#FFA500; color:#000000;"|No. inseries
!! style="background-color:#FFA500; color:#000000;"|No. inseason
!! style="background-color:#FFA500; color:#000000;"|Title
!! style="background-color:#FFA500; color:#000000;"|Directed by
!! style="background-color:#FFA500; color:#000000;"|Written by
!! style="background-color:#FFA500; color:#000000;"|Original airdate
!! style="background-color:#FFA500; color:#000000;"|UK Viewing figures
!! style="background-color:#FFA500; color:#000000;"|Original Law & Order episode
|-

|}

Law & Order: UK
2010 British television seasons